Isetemkheb D was the sister-wife of the Theban High Priest of Amun Pinedjem II during the Twenty-first Dynasty of Egypt.

Family
Isetemkheb D was the daughter of the King's Son, Theban High Priest of Amun and General, Menkheperre, and his wife, Isetemkheb C. Isetemkheb D married her brother Pinedjem II.

Isetemkheb and Pinedjem II are thought to have had four children: 
 Theban High Priest of Amun and Pharaoh Psusennes II (Pasebakhaenniut II),
 Lady Harweben, who was a Chief of the Harem of Amen-Re
 God's Wife of Amun Hennutawy
 Lady of the House and Chantress Maatkare.

Burial
Isetemkheb's mummy and coffins were found in the royal cache found in TT320 in Deir el-Bahari in Thebes. Istemkheb's mummy was never unwrapped.

References

11th-century BC clergy
10th-century BC clergy
People of the Twenty-first Dynasty of Egypt
Ancient Egyptian mummies